Lee Hae-chang (born Mat 11, 1987) is the catcher of Hanwha Eagles of the KBO League. He joined Nexen Heroes in 2010. Then he moved to KT Wiz in 2015.  He graduated Hanyang University.

He moved through the second draft of the KBO League in 2020.

References

External links 
 Lee Hae-chang on MyKBO Stats

1987 births
KT Wiz players
Baseball catchers
Living people